Jane Parminter (1750–1811)  and Mary Parminter (1767–1849) were cousins and British travellers and designers from Devon who commissioned and had a hand in designing the sixteen sided house named A La Ronde. They also built a chapel, called Point in View, a schoolhouse for local girls and almshouses for local spinster women on the site, and set up wills that passed the properties from women to women.

Early life 
Jane Parminter was born on 5 February 1750 in Lisbon, Portugal where her father, a Devon wine merchant, was based. Her mother was Jane Arboyne (or Arbouin) and was of Huguenot descent. She had an elder brother, William, as well as younger siblings: MaryAnne, Elizabeth, Margaret and John.

The family were visiting London in 1755 when the Lisbon earthquake destroyed their Portuguese business. Her father returned to Portugal to help rebuild, but the rest of the family moved to Devon. 

In 1773, the Parminters were living in Braunton when they took in Jane's cousins Mary and Rebecca Parminter. Jane acted as Mary's guardian.

Travel and design work 
In 1784, after the death of her father, Jane organised a Grand Tour of Europe for herself, Mary, Elizabeth and Jane Colville. They visited France, Italy, Germany, Switzerland and beyond. Elizabeth had returned to London by 1788, and Jane and Mary followed in 1791 after Elizabeth died. Miss Colville disappears from the records.

Inspired by the chapel of San Vitale in Ravenna, which they had visited on their tour, Jane and Mary had the sixteen-sided A La Ronde built just outside Exmouth in Devon. Family lore suggests Jane designed the building itself but recent research suggests a Mr Lowder may have created the plans based on her ideas.

The interior of the building was decorated by the cousins. It includes the shell gallery, which took the women a decade to complete. The building was designed to house their collection from the Tour. They also laid out the grounds.

In the summer of 1811 the cousins also drew up plans for a small chapel, Point in View, built next to the house along with almshouses and a school.

Religious views 
The Parminter family were active dissenters from the church of England, worshipping at Meeting Houses instead. Having moved to A La Ronde, the cousins worshipped at the Glenorchy United Reform Church, Exmouth. Elizabeth and Mary were particularly concerned with the conversion of Jewish women to Christianity: the terms of the almshouses prioritised giving homes to women who had converted.

Deaths 
Jane Parminter died in 1811 and was buried in a vault beneath the Point in View chapel that they had built on the site.

After Jane's death, her estate passed to Mary. Mary set up a charity, the Mary Parminter Trust or Point in View Trust, which still runs today. Mary died in 1849 and was buried alongside her cousin. Her will stipulated that the house and estate would be passed in sequence to six named, unmarried female relatives.

A La Ronde is currently run by the National Trust.

References

External links 

 National Trust: A La Ronde

1750 births
1767 births
18th-century British women
19th-century British women
1811 deaths
1849 deaths
Duos